Johnny Carpenter (Jasper Carpenter; June 25, 1914 – February 27, 2003) was an American film actor, screenwriter and producer.  He was known mostly for his work in Westerns and for his association with filmmaker Ed Wood.  He used the stage names John, Johnny, Josh, and John Forbes.

Film career
Johnny began working in Hollywood in the mid-1940s, mostly in bit parts in B-Westerns.  By 1950, Johnny had graduated to larger roles in films produced by Jack Schwarz, including Border Outlaws and Cattle Queen, his breakout film.  He starred in several more B-Westerns, all the while continuing to do stunt work in higher profile films.

From 1953 to 1956, Carpenter produced four movies independently; Son of the Renegade (1953), The Lawless Rider (1954), Outlaw Treasure (1955) and I Killed Wild Bill Hickok (1956).  These four films have drawn comparisons between Carpenter and his friend Ed Wood, who actually helped produce The Lawless Rider and may have worked on Son of the Renegade, as well.  Carpenter would also make a featured appearance in Wood's 1959 film, Night of the Ghouls.

By the 1960s, Western film work had dried up and Carpenter's output decreased, with his last film role being in 1961's Tomboy and the Champ.

Heaven on Earth
Besides his work in Westerns, Carpenter had a great love of horses and tried to share his enthusiasm with all who cared.  One way in which he spread his love of the outdoors was through his "Heaven on Earth" ranch.  First located in Glendale, California (later moved Lake View Terrace), the ranch was available for handicapped children (mostly from Los Angeles) to come and spend a day with the horses and enjoy the mock Western town that served as the ranch's backdrop. The ranch began in the mid-1940s and ran until Carpenter was evicted in 1994, having run for around fifty years. 

Carpenter died in Burbank, California, in 2003, at age 88.

References

External links
 
 http://www.b-westerns.com/johnnyc.htm.  This website, and every other one I've reviewed, lists his birthplace as "Debinsville"—that is incorrect; he was born in Dardanelle, Yell County, Arkansas.
 

1914 births
2003 deaths
American male film actors
American male screenwriters
American film producers
Deaths from cancer in California
Burials at Forest Lawn Memorial Park (Hollywood Hills)
20th-century American male actors
20th-century American male writers
20th-century American screenwriters